Chaenotheca furfuracea is a mealy (farinaceous), bright yellow-green leprose pin lichen.  It is in the family Coniocybaceae and can be found in European countries like Belgium, Luxembourg, and Switzerland. The species are growing mostly on beeches and oaks, and on tree roots of spruces. They also grow on detritus or sand, and in rare cases on fissures of siliceous rocks. It prefers climates with high humidity and low luminosity.

References

Ascomycota
Lichen species
Lichens described in 1753
Lichens of Europe
Taxa named by Carl Linnaeus